South Korea, as Republic of Korea, competed at the 1960 Winter Olympics in Squaw Valley, United States.

Alpine skiing

Men

Cross-country skiing

Men

Speed skating

Men

Women

References
Official Olympic Reports

Korea, South
1960
1960 in South Korean sport